Susan Eva Moncrieff, née Jones (born 8 June 1978) is a female retired English high jumper.

Athletics career
She finished sixth at the 1997 Summer Universiade, and sixth at the 1998 European Indoor Championships.

Also in 1998 she represented England in the high jump event, at the 1998 Commonwealth Games in Kuala Lumpur, Malaysia.

In 1999 she finished ninth at the 1999 European U23 Championships, tenth at the 1999 Summer Universiade,.

She then won the 2001 European Cup and competed at the 2001 World Championships, In 2002 she finished fifth at the 2002 European Indoor Championships but her finest achievement came was winning a silver medal at the 2002 Commonwealth Games. The same year she finished seventh at the 2002 European Championships.

After appearing in the 2003 World Indoor Championships and the 2005 European Indoor Championships she went to her third Commonwealth Games (under her married name) finishing sixth at the 2006 Commonwealth Games.

At the National Championships she became AAA champion in 2001, 2002, 2003, 2004 and 2005 as well as AAA indoor champion in 1998, 2001, 2002, 2003, 2004, 2005 and 2006.

Her personal best jump was 1.95 metres, achieved at the 2001 European Cup in Bremen. This was the joint British record until 2014.

References

1978 births
Living people
English female high jumpers
Commonwealth Games medallists in athletics
Commonwealth Games silver medallists for England
Athletes (track and field) at the 1998 Commonwealth Games
Athletes (track and field) at the 2002 Commonwealth Games
Athletes (track and field) at the 2006 Commonwealth Games
World Athletics Championships athletes for Great Britain
Competitors at the 1999 Summer Universiade
Medallists at the 2002 Commonwealth Games